The Times & Transcript is a newspaper from Moncton, New Brunswick. It serves Greater Moncton and eastern New Brunswick. Its offices and printing facilities are located on Main Street in Downtown Moncton. The paper is published by Brunswick News.

The Times & Transcript building also houses the presses that print all Brunswick News newspapers, including Saint John's Telegraph Journal and Fredericton's The Daily Gleaner. It also produces 14 weekly newspapers in both French and English serving all major communities in New Brunswick.

History
The Times and Transcript was formed by the merger of The Moncton Times and The Moncton Transcript in 1983. The following tables contain the historical names of both those papers.

Moncton Times

Moncton Transcript

In May 2022 the Monday print edition was discontinued, and in March 2023 the print edition was reduced to three days a week. Daily news coverage continues online.

See also
List of newspapers in Canada

References

External links
timestranscript.com - Breaking News, New Brunswick, Canada

Mass media in Moncton
Brunswick News publications
Buildings and structures in Moncton
Daily newspapers published in New Brunswick
Publications established in 1868
1868 establishments in Canada